The 2022 Prototype Cup Germany was the first season of the Prototype Cup. Creventic and German automobile club ADAC are the organizers and promoters of the series. The races will be contested with Le Mans Prototype and Group CN cars, as well as some special prototypes.

Calendar

Teams and drivers

Race results

Drivers' Championship

{|
|valign="top"|

Notes:
  – Half points were awarded at the Lausitzring races.

See also
24H Series

Notes

References

External links

Prototype Cup Germany
Prototype Cup Germany